The Bayard Park Neighborhood is a neighborhood in Evansville, Indiana which is bounded by Lincoln Avenue, US Highway 41, Washington Avenue and Garvin Street. The Bayard Park Historic District contains approximately 87 acres including 335 contributing buildings and 1 contributing site within the neighborhood boundaries. It was added to the National Register of Historic Places in 1985. The architecture of residential homes in the neighborhood include quaint 1890s Queen Anne cottages, ground-hugging bungalows, American Fourquares, and high-style Early American and English revival types.  The neighborhood also features Evansville's first neighborhood park and the East Branch Library, a Carnegie Library funded by the renowned philanthropist Andrew Carnegie.

History 

The Bayard Park enclave took root in the last decades of the 19th century as the city of Evansville expanded eastward. The area's future as a residential area was determined when various owners of the land determined in 1893 to prohibit, via recorded plan restrictions, any type of commerce in their respective subdivisions. This made the neighborhood the first planned land development in Evansville.

By 1897, the area had been annexed into Evansville which brought with it city amenities like water and sewer lines, and the erection of a public school. As the 20th century commenced, the city's middle class moved heavily into the area, with the period of 1905 to 1915 one of intense development. By the beginning of the Great Depression, the residential district was fully established.

Demographics 

Like many urbanized neighborhoods, Bayard Park has undergone significant demographic changes over the years. In 2009 about 22.9% of the residents in the historic district of the neighborhood lived below the Poverty line, compared with 13.7% in the city as a whole.

Bayard Park 

Bayard Park, located within the neighborhood and giving the district its name, was Evansville's first neighborhood preserve. The ten-acre tract was donated in 1901 to the city for perpetual park use by Mrs. Martha Orr Bayard (1836–1909). The gift was made on the condition that the park be named after her late husband, banker Samuel Bayard, and that she be allowed to landscape it; however, she further stipulated that the city was to provide maintenance.

References 

Historic districts on the National Register of Historic Places in Indiana
Victorian architecture in Indiana
Geography of Evansville, Indiana
Historic districts in Evansville, Indiana
Tourist attractions in Evansville, Indiana
National Register of Historic Places in Evansville, Indiana